Caretakers is a 2019 studio album by American rock singer-songwriter Pete Yorn. It has received mostly favorable reviews from critics, including 4 stars on Allmusic.com and featured the hit radio single “Calm Down”. The video for “Calm Down” had over 10 million views as of this writing.

Critical reception
4 stars All Music Guide, an appealing blend that sets it apart from most other albums in 2019, along with most of Yorn's catalog.
https://www.metacritic.com/music/caretakers/pete-yorn

Track listing
"Calm Down" (Jackson Phillips, Soko, Pete Yorn)– 2:55
"I Wanna Be the One" (Yorn)– 3:31
"Can't Stop You" (Phillips, Yorn) – 3:07
"Idols (We Don't Ever Have to Say Goodbye)" (Phillips, Yorn)– 2:54
"Do You Want to Love Again?" (Yorn)– 3:09
"Caretakers" (Phillips, Yorn)– 3:18
"Friends" (Yorn)– 4:10
"ECT" (Phillips, Yorn)– 3:29
"POV" (Phillips, Yorn)– 3:12
"Opal" (Yorn)– 2:44
"A Fire in the Sun" (Phillips, Yorn)– 2:18
"Try" (Phillips, Yorn)– 2:55

Personnel
Pete Yorn– acoustic and electric guitars; vocals; production; bass guitar on "Calm Down", “I Wanna Be the One”, "Idols (We Don't Ever Have to Say Goodbye)", “Do You Want To Love Again?”, "ECT", "POV", and "Opal"; synth bass on “I Wanna Be the One”; backing vocals on "Idols (We Don't Ever Have to Say Goodbye)" and “Do You Want To Love Again?”; banjo on "Friends" and "Opal"; percussion on "Friends" and "Opal"
Allen Alcantara– art direction and layout
Hazel English– vocals on "Calm Down"
Shawn Everett– mastering
Jackson Phillips– production; recording; mixing; drums and rhythm programming; backing vocals; electric guitar on "Calm Down", "I Wanna Be the One", “Can’t Stop You”, "Idols (We Don't Ever Have to Say Goodbye)", and “Do You Want to Love Again?”; synth on "Calm Down", “Do You Want to Love Again?”, "Friends", "ECT", "POV", "Opal", "A Fire in the Sun", and "Try"; synth bass on "Calm Down", “Do You Want to Love Again?”, "Caretakers”, "Friends", "Opal", and "A Fire in the Sun"; percussion on "Calm Down", "Idols (We Don't Ever Have to Say Goodbye)", “Do You Want to Love Again?”, and "Try"; acoustic guitar on "Calm Down" and “Can’t Stop You”; baritone guitar on "I Wanna Be the One"; juno synth on "I Wanna Be the One", “Can’t Stop You”, and "Opal"; juno synth bass on “Can’t Stop You”, "Caretakers”, and "ECT"; e-bow on “Can’t Stop You” and "Friends"; hi bass on "Idols (We Don't Ever Have to Say Goodbye)"; piano on "Idols (We Don't Ever Have to Say Goodbye)" and "Caretakers"; juno bass on "Idols (We Don't Ever Have to Say Goodbye)", "POV", and "Try"; bass guitar on "A Fire in the Sun"; keyboards on "Try"
Beth Yorn– cover photograph

References

External links

2019 albums
Pete Yorn albums
Self-released albums